This is a list of 1988 British incumbents.

Government
 Monarch
 Head of State – Elizabeth II, Queen of the United Kingdom (1952–2022)
 Prime Minister
 Head of Government – Margaret Thatcher, Prime Minister of the United Kingdom (1979–1990)
First Lord of the Treasury
 Margaret Thatcher, First Lord of the Treasury (1979–1990)
Chancellor of the Exchequer
 Nigel Lawson, Chancellor of the Exchequer (1983–1989)
Second Lord of the Treasury
 Nigel Lawson, Second Lord of the Treasury (1983–1989)
Secretary of State for Foreign and Commonwealth Affairs
 Sir Geoffrey Howe, Secretary of State for Foreign and Commonwealth Affairs (1983–1989)
Secretary of State for the Home Department
 Douglas Hurd, Secretary of State for the Home Department (1985–1989)
Secretary of State for Transport
 Paul Channon, Secretary of State for Transport (1987–1989)
Secretary of State for Scotland
 Malcolm Rifkind, Secretary of State for Scotland (1986–1990)
Secretary of State for Health
 John Moore, Secretary of State for Social Services (1987–1988)
 Kenneth Clarke, Secretary of State for Health (1988–1990)
Secretary of State for Northern Ireland
 Tom King, Secretary of State for Northern Ireland (1985–1989)
Secretary of State for Defence
 George Younger, Secretary of State for Defence (1986–1989)
Secretary of State for Trade and Industry
 David Young, Secretary of State for Trade and Industry (1987–1989)
Secretary of State for Education and Science
 Kenneth Baker, Secretary of State for Education and Science (1986–1989)
Secretary of State for Wales
 Peter Walker, Secretary of State for Wales (1987–1990)
Lord Privy Seal
 John Wakeham, Lord Privy Seal (1987–1988)
 John Ganzoni, 2nd Baron Belstead, Lord Privy Seal (1988–1990)
Leader of the House of Commons
 John Wakeham, Leader of the House of Commons (1987–1989)
Lord President of the Council
 William Whitelaw, 1st Viscount Whitelaw, Lord President of the Council (1983–1988)
 John Wakeham, Lord President of the Council (1988–1989)
Lord Chancellor
 James Mackay, Baron Mackay of Clashfern, Lord Chancellor (1987–1997)
Secretary of State for Social Security
 see Secretary of State for Social Services (from 1988 Health)
 John Moore, Secretary of State for Social Security (1988–1989)
Chancellor of the Duchy of Lancaster
 Kenneth Clarke, Chancellor of the Duchy of Lancaster (1987–1988)
 Tony Newton, Chancellor of the Duchy of Lancaster (1988–1989)

Religion
 Archbishop of Canterbury
 Robert Runcie, Archbishop of Canterbury (1980–1991)
 Archbishop of York
 John Habgood, Archbishop of York (1983–1995)

1988
Leaders
British incumbents